Eastvale is a city located in northwestern Riverside County, California, in the Inland Empire region of Southern California. The area transitioned from a dairy farm enclave to a developed community starting in the 1990s and was formally incorporated on October 1, 2010. As of the 2020 census, the city had a population of 69,757. The city's name is derived from "East Vale" as a listed school district in 1893 by the Riverside County Board of Commissioners.  

The city's boundaries extend from Hellman Avenue to the west (the San Bernardino County line), State Route 60 to the north (also the San Bernardino County line), the Santa Ana River and Norco to the south, and Interstate 15 to the east. It is surrounded by the cities of Chino, Ontario, Jurupa Valley, Norco, and Corona. 

The city is served by the highly accredited public school system - the Corona Norco Unified School District. According to the 2020 United States Census, Eastvale has a median household income at one of the top earning percentiles in the country at $119,213.

History

Before 1954
The Eastvale region was part of the homeland of the indigenous Tongva people for about 8,000 years. Specifically, the Tongva people had a large metropolis centered in Eastvale. 

Recorded history of land in the far western side of present-day Riverside County and north of the Santa Ana River begins in 1838, when Mexican Governor Juan Alvarado, of the  Alta California territory, granted Rancho Jurupa (some 48 square miles) to Juan Bandini. The city of Eastvale now occupies approximately the westernmost one-quarter of former Rancho Jurupa land grant. The Mexican–American War between the United States and Mexico ended in 1848 with the Treaty of Guadalupe Hidalgo, by which Mexico ceded Alta California and much other Southwestern land to the US. Two years later, on September 9, 1850, California became a U.S. state.

For 65 years, between 1889 and 1954, the Fuller family owned about 6 square miles of ranch land on the north side of the Santa Ana River. Almost half of present-day Eastvale, between Schleisman Road and the river, was included within the Fuller ranch's boundaries.

Eastvale, often spelled with two words as "East Vale" in early days, was an elementary school district in Riverside County for more than 50 years, from County formation in 1893 until 1947 when the district was merged with Corona and Norco schools.

Recent history

Once a rural area, Eastvale was predominantly dairy farms and agricultural until the late 1990s. At that time, the area started to suburbanize to accommodate the influx of people coming from Orange and Los Angeles counties seeking more affordable housing.

Incorporation effort
Eastvale was one of several unincorporated areas of Riverside County that had strong community support for city incorporation. The passage of AB 1602 in the mid-2000s, a state bill that adds funds from vehicle license fees, made it easier for unincorporated areas to attain cityhood. In 2008, the communities of Menifee, Sun City and Quail Valley merged and incorporated as the City of Menifee. The law also brought renewed interest in incorporation efforts for Mira Loma and Jurupa Valley (Mira Loma, Pedley, Glen Avon, Sunnyslope, and Rubidoux).

The community of Eastvale actively attempted to incorporate from the mid-2000s through 2010. The incorporation effort was being led by the Eastvale Incorporation Committee. Other groups were also proponents of Eastvale cityhood, such as the Yes on Eastvale Cityhood Committee.

The Eastvale Incorporation Committee successfully gathered enough signatures to qualify on the June 8, 2010. "Measure A" was placed on the ballot deciding incorporation. “Measure B” would decide how the city council would be elected: at large, by district, or from district. Measure A passed with 65.8% of voters approving incorporation. Eastvale officially incorporated on October 1, 2010.  Voters also decided that the city council would be elected at large. Eastvale's first city council members were Ike Bootsma, Jeff DeGrandpre, Kelly Howell, Adam Rush, and Ric Welch. The council selected Adam Rush as Eastvale's first mayor.

Geography
The Los Angeles County line is approximately 8 miles northwest of Eastvale, and the Orange County line is approximately 5 miles to the southwest. The proximity of these two heavily commercialized counties, and the fact that Eastvale is roughly squared between Interstate 15 and State Routes 91, 60, and 71, has made Eastvale popular for those who commute to these counties for employment, making Eastvale a commuter town.

According to the Eastvale area plan, Eastvale has a total area of 13.1 square miles (33.9 km2), of which 12.5 square miles (32.3 km2) is land and 0.6 square miles (1.6 km2), or 4.76%, is water.

According to the United States Census Bureau, the former census-designated place of Eastvale covered an area of 11.4 square miles (29.6 km2), 99.65% of it land, and 0.35% of it water.

Eastvale has two postal ZIP codes, 92880 and 91752, which often use mailing addresses of Corona and Mira Loma, respectively.

Most of Eastvale, like most of western Riverside County, has the telephone area code of 951. However, according to the California Public Utilities Commission, because the 951 area code was split along telephone service areas and not strictly along county boundaries, some Eastvale residents still retain the older 909 area code.

Climate
Eastvale experiences a warm Mediterranean climate (Köppen climate classification CSa) and has mild winters and hot summers. Most of the rainfall (as in all of Southern California) occurs during winter and early spring. The winter low temperatures can get cold enough for frost. Winter days are pleasant, with the mercury staying around 65 degrees Fahrenheit (occasionally warming into the 70s). Summertime is hot, with highs averaging in the low 90s. During the hottest months, daytime temperatures in Eastvale often exceed 100 degrees.

Demographics

2020 
As of the 2020 United States census, Eastvale had a population of 69,757. The city's racial makeup was 26.5% (18,480) White (19.5% Non-Hispanic white), 30.1% (20,983) Asian, 9.1% (6,358) Black or African American, 0.2% (208) Pacific Islander, 0.2% (650) Native American, 12.8% (11,088) of other races, and 8.1% (11,990) from two or more races. 37.5% (26,164) of the population were Hispanic or Latino of any race.

2010 
The 2010 United States Census reported that Eastvale had a population of 53,668. The racial makeup of Eastvale was 42.9% (22,998) White (23.7% Non-Hispanic White), 24.2% (13,003) Asian, 9.7% (5,190) African American, 0.5% (290) Native American, 0.4% (198) Pacific Islander, 17.1% (9,172) from other races, and 5.2% (2,817) from two or more races. 40.0% (21,445) of the population were Hispanic or Latino of any race.

The Census reported that 53,660 people (100% of the population) lived in households, 2 (0%) lived in non-institutionalized group quarters, and 6 (0%) were institutionalized.

There were 13,640 households, out of which 8,556 (62.7%) had children under the age of 18 living in them, 9,983 (73.2%) were opposite-sex married couples living together, 1,385 (10.2%) had a female householder with no husband present, 893 (6.5%) had a male householder with no wife present. There were 701 (5.1%) unmarried opposite-sex partnerships, and 109 (0.8%) same-sex married couples or partnerships. 871 households (6.4%) were made up of individuals, and 93 (0.7%) had someone living alone who was 65 years of age or older. The average household size was 3.93. There were 12,261 families (89.9% of all households); the average family size was 4.05.

The population was spread out, with 17,786 people (33.1%) under the age of 18, 4,516 people (8.4%) aged 18 to 24, 18,659 people (34.8%) aged 25 to 44, 10,203 people (19.0%) aged 45 to 64, and 2,504 people (4.7%) who were 65 years of age or older. The median age was 30.9 years. For every 100 females, there were 98.1 males. For every 100 females age 18 and over, there were 96.5 males.

The homeowner vacancy rate was 3.1%; the rental vacancy rate was 3.1%. 43,936 people (81.9% of the population) lived in owner-occupied housing units and 9,724 people (18.1%) lived in rental housing units.

According to the 2010 United States Census, Eastvale had a median household income of $109,841, with 3.6% of the population living below the federal poverty line.

Economy

Top employers
According to the city's 2020 Comprehensive Annual Financial Report, the top employers in the city are:

Government

City government                                                                                                      
Eastvale's first city council was elected on June 8, 2010, a few months before it was officially incorporated: Adam Rush, Ric Welch, Kelly Howell, Ike C. Bootsma, and Jeff DeGrandpre. Former mayor Jocelyn Yow is the youngest woman of color to ever serve as mayor of a California city.

Federal, State, and County government  
Democrats Dianne Feinstein and Alex Padilla represent California in the United States Senate.

In the California State Legislature, Eastvale is in the 31st Senate District, represented by Democrat Richard Roth, and in the 60th Assembly District, represented by Democrat Sabrina Cervantes.

In the Riverside County Board of Supervisors, Eastvale is in the Second District, represented by Karen Spiegel.

Community
A committee of concerned Eastvale residents, the Eastvale Community Committee (ECC), was formed so that issues facing the growing community would be addressed. Formed in 2002, the ECC holds public meetings with county representatives, utility operators, law enforcement agencies, local school representatives, and local business owners. A group of volunteer residents publishes a summary of the meetings and other articles in the quarterly Eastvale Edition which is mailed to most residents and is also available online.

A separate project, Eastvale Events, encourages community involvement by developing and coordinating community events. Eastvale Picnic in the Park, Eastvale Holiday Showcase, and Eastvale Fall Festival are a few of the sponsored events.

Education
Eastvale is a part of the Corona-Norco Unified School District.

Elementary schools
 Clara Barton Elementary School
 Harada Elementary School
 Ronald Reagan Elementary School
 Rosa Parks Elementary School
 Eastvale Elementary School
 Rondo School of Discovery
 Academy of Innovation (in and around Eastvale)

Intermediate schools
 River Heights Intermediate School
 Dr. Augustine Ramirez Intermediate School

High schools
 Eleanor Roosevelt High School

References

External links 

 
 Eastvale Chamber of Commerce
 The Press-Enterprise – Eastvale Local News

 
2010 establishments in California
Cities in Riverside County, California
Former Census-designated places in Riverside County, California
Incorporated cities and towns in California
Populated places established in 2010
Populated places on the Santa Ana River